Mournin', the only album by Night Sun, was released in 1972. This album is considered to have many examples of formative heavy metal styles.

Track listing
 "Plastic Shotgun" - 2:34
 "Crazy Woman" - 4:18
 "Got a Bone of My Own" - 7:47
 "Slush Pan Man" - 4:22
 "Living with the Dying" - 5:27
 "Come Down" - 5:46
 "Blind" - 4:22
 "Nightmare" - 3:14
 "Don't Start Flying" - 3:05

Performance and production credits
 Bruno Schaab - Lead Vocals, Bass
 Walter Kirchgassner - Guitar
 Knut Rossler - Organ, Piano, Trumpet, Bassoon
 Ulrich Staudt - Drums, Percussion
 Konrad Plank - Producer

Releases
1972: Label: Zebra 2949 004
1997: Label: Second Battle SB 041 (CD Digipak re-issue)

References

1972 albums